The following is a list of characters that first appeared in the BBC soap opera EastEnders in 1986, by order of first appearance. All characters were introduced by the show's co-creator Julia Smith. The first character to be introduced during the year is John Fisher (Dave Dale), a drag queen hired for The Queen Victoria pub. Jan Hammond (Jane How), the long-term mistress of Den Watts (Leslie Grantham), was introduced in January. March sees the first appearances of The Firm mobster Brad Williams (Jonathan Stratt), Dot Cotton's (June Brown) husband Charlie Cotton (Christopher Hancock) and new brewery area manager James Willmott-Brown (William Boyde). The newborn daughter of Michelle Fowler (Susan Tully), Vicki Fowler (Emma Herry), was introduced in May. Judith Jacob and Pam St. Clement made their debuts as health visitor Carmel Jackson and Pat Butcher, the former wife of Pete Beale (Peter Dean), in June. June also sees the beginning of a new storyline, The Banned, which introduces Harry Reynolds (Gareth Potter), Tessa Parker (Josephine Melville) and Eddie Hunter (Simon Henderson). Irene (Katherine Parr), the aunt of Lofty Holloway (Tom Watt), begins appearing from July. Michael Cashman and Donald Tandy joined the cast as middle-class yuppie Colin Russell and army war veteran Tom Clements respectively in August. New general practitioner Jaggat Singh (Amerjit Deu) and Barry Clark (Gary Hailes), a love interest for Colin, make their first appearances in November. Rezaul Kabir (Tanveer Ghani), the cousin of Naima Jeffery (Shreela Ghosh), is introduced in December. Additionally, multiple other characters appear throughout the year.

John Fisher

John Fisher, played by Dave Dale, is a drag queen who is hired by publican Angie Watts (Anita Dobson) in January 1986 to perform for the premier drag night at The Queen Victoria public house. Following the publicity over Angie's drink driving case, she and her husband, Den (Leslie Grantham), worry that the brewery who owns the pub might find cause to cancel their tenancy, and 'free entertainment' is seen as a way to bolster the evening trade.

The first drag night is a success until Pete Beale (Peter Dean) starts heckling the performer. John mistakes Pete's intent, thinking he wants to join in with the act. John playfully takes Pete's pint on-stage and Pete leaps after it, causing a tussle to ensue. Seconds later, Den finds himself on the floor breaking up the pair. The surprise arrival of Den's mistress, Jan Hammond (Jane How), prompts Den to close the pub early, so the act is halted prematurely.

Sharon Watts (Letitia Dean) is quite impressed with the drag artiste and thinks him to be a caring and sensitive person. When he mentions that his other job is delivering 'kiss-o-grams', she hatches a plan for starting her own business. John performs several more drag evenings in The Vic. His last appearance is on 27 February 1986.

Jan Hammond

Jan Hammond, played by Jane How, appears in 1986 as the long-term mistress of Den Watts (Leslie Grantham). Jan is considered by the locals as a posh upper-class sort of woman and works at an art gallery. Den has an affair with her while he is still married to Angie Watts (Anita Dobson). She is always hated by Angie and Den's adopted daughter Sharon Watts (Letitia Dean) but she tries her best to get along with her. She moves into The Queen Victoria at one point on Den's insistence, but is not much of a landlady so moves out soon after. Den tries to leave Angie for Jan so he tells Angie he is leaving her. Angie grows desperate and to stop him from leaving her she tells him that she only has six months to live. Den believes her but discovers many months later that she is lying while they are on holiday in Venice. Den serves Angie divorce papers on Christmas Day 1986.

Eventually, Jan grows tired of Den not having a proper relationship with her, so she ends their affair after he refuses to leave Walford with her. She leaves Walford in 1987 and goes on to marry a man called Dario Chimisso (Marino Mase) on a gondola in Venice. She makes a brief return in 2002 for Angie's funeral. She returns to give Sharon a portrait that Den had left with her many years earlier. She briefly returns again in 2003 in a lead-up to Den's return 14 years since he has been shot and presumed dead by an employee of the gangland organisation The Firm. Den's long lost son Dennis Rickman (Nigel Harman) tracks Jan down and she reveals that Den had survived the shooting and came to her for help. With her help, Den was able to flee to Spain to protect himself and his family.

Brad Williams

Brad Williams, played by Jonathan Stratt, is a mobster heavy for the East End gangster organisation known as The Firm. He is of low importance within the organisation and is generally used as an errand boy. He is first seen in March 1986 and over the next two years he appears occasionally to inform Den Watts (Leslie Grantham) of his bosses' orders. Den works in league with the Firm on a variety of dodgy dealings.

Towards the end of 1987 Brad is instructed to scare graphic designer, Colin Russell (Michael Cashman), who is a jury member in a trial for an associate of the Firm. Brad and Den put pressure on Colin to give a verdict of 'not guilty' at the trial, and when he refuses Brad steals his keys and vandalises his flat, causing all sorts of problems for Colin.

During 1988 Brad is seen more frequently, turning up to aid the running of the Firm's business in Walford, Strokes winebar, which is being managed by Den and is really a front for an illegal gambling den. The petty criminal Darren Roberts (Gary McDonald) manages to get on the wrong side of Brad when he tries to play him off against the owner of The Dagmar, James Wilmott-Brown (William Boyde). The Firm's money lending business, 'Walford Investments', are in the process of securing the takeover of James' ailing winebar, albeit against his wishes. Darren, sensing an opportunity, promises to provide James protection against the Firm, whilst all the while attempting to get onto the Firm's payroll via Brad. Incensed by Darren's audacity, Brad takes him aside and gives him a severe beating, and Darren leaves Walford shortly after.

In July 1988, Den discovers Kathy Beale (Gillian Taylforth) after she had been raped by James Wilmott-Brown, and instantly seeks revenge. He demands retribution from his contacts within the Firm, Brad and Joanne Francis (Pamela Salem), and is enraged when they refused to act. Den manages to persuade Brad to help him anyway by conning him into thinking that James' downfall will please his bosses and Den watches with glee as the Dagmar burns down in flames. However the resulting police investigation puts the Firm's business in serious jeopardy. They then decide that to put a halt to the investigation either Brad or Den have to take the blame for the arson attack. Neither Brad nor Den is willing to take the blame, and both are then involved in a personal war to persuade the other to take the rap.

Brad immediately calls on the services of Rod Norman (Christopher McHallem), via threats, and forces him to give the police a tip off about Den. The police begin questioning Den and realising that he has gotten in way over his head, he decides that he will accept the blame for the arson, but instead of serving time in prison, he decides to flee the country to avoid arrest. The Firm agree to this and Den is taken into hiding. However the Firm subsequently set up a hit on Den, which fails when he escapes from hiding and turns himself into the police to avoid the Firm's heavies.

As the Firm busy themselves with ways in which to silence Den from inside, Brad causes more grief by doing a bit of moonlighting; breaking into several people's houses on the Square with an accomplice who works as a cab driver for Ali Osman (Nejdet Salih). The burglaries result in a greater police presence in the area. The Firm are not impressed and Gregory Mantel (Pavel Douglas) – a superior member of the Firm – threatens Brad with serious repercussions should his deviance continue. Brad stops the burglaries, but his accomplice continues without him and is eventually caught by the police and is quick to implicate Brad. The investigating officer, D.I. Ashley, decides to use this piece of information to manipulate the dimwitted Brad. He threatens to put him in prison unless he acts as an informant. Brad is forced to relay information on The Firm. Strokes is closed down as a result and various members of the Firm are arrested. With the Firm under threat from the police, Gregory Mantel decides that Den has to be the informant and makes arrangements to have him eliminated.

On the day of Den's trial, Mantel's heavies break Den out of custody and take him to the Firm's headquarters, where he is greeted by Brad. Brad imprisons him in a room to await the arrival of Mantel. However, Den is not about to go down without a fight and knowing how easily influenced Brad is, he makes one last attempt to secure his freedom. He plays upon Brad's fears, relaying that he had heard that Brad is to be the next victim on the Firm's hit-list. Brad is easily swayed and he decides to help Den escape. He lures the other gang member, Marco, into the cell where an awaiting Den jumps him and throws him to the floor, whilst Brad locks him up in Den's place. The two then escape from the headquarters, and Brad speeds off in his car, leaving Den to fend for himself.

Brad immediately goes to the police and hands himself in. He promises to confess everything he knows regarding the arson, Den, and the Firm. Meanwhile, Mantel, who is furious with Brad's betrayal, tracks Den down, he is shot and presumed dead for over 14 years. However he returns to Walford in 2003, revealing that he had faked his own death to secure his survival. It is also revealed that a man named Brad has been charged for the arson attack of the Dagmar. Subsequently, Den is no longer wanted by the police.

Charlie Cotton

Charlie Cotton, played by Christopher Hancock, is a recurring character, introduced in March 1986 as the estranged husband of Dot Cotton (June Brown). He appears in stints until producers made the decision to kill the character off-screen in 1991, to aid development of characters connected to him. June Brown was openly against the killing of Charlie. Charlie appears one last time, in October 2000, as an apparition, warning his son Nick to change his ways. Charlie comes and goes throughout his duration in the show; he is first seen 13 months after the soap's launch in 1986. Depicted as bigamous and a conman, Charlie typically reappears in the show whenever he needs money or temporary accommodation and, because of Dot's Christian ideals regarding forgiveness, Charlie always is permitted to return. According to Christopher Hancock, Charlie is "a truly revolting character, a loser" and the character has been described as a "despicable small-time villain [...] lazy and pathetic". Author Kate Lock has described Charlie as a "sly, shifty, weaselly man". To become the character of Charlie, Hancock wore stick-on sideburns.

James Willmott-Brown

James Willmott-Brown, played by William Boyde, is an ex-army officer, arriving in Albert Square in March 1986 as the area manager for 'Luxford and Copley', the brewery that owns The Queen Victoria. By December, he decides to move to the square and buys Debbie Wilkins's (Shirley Cheriton) house at 43 Albert Square when she sells it following her fiancé, Andy's (Ross Davidson), death. He and Debbie later have a fling, but it doesn't progress into anything serious. Pat Wicks (Pam St. Clement) takes a shine to him and tries seducing him on several occasions, but is rebuffed each time. During the early years, he is friendly with Colin Russell (Michael Cashman).

Vicki Fowler

Vicki Fowler, played by Emma Herry from the character's birth in 1986 to 1988, Samantha Leigh Martin from 1988 to 1995, and Scarlett Johnson from 2003 to 2004, is the daughter of Michelle Fowler (Susan Tully). The character is born in the serial, and was conceived in a controversial storyline about teenage pregnancy. Exploiting a whodunnit angle, at the time of the first showing, viewers were not initially told who was the father, and press interest in the fledgling show escalated as journalists attempted to guess. The audience finally discovered his identity in October 1985 in episode 66. Written by series co-creator/script-editor Tony Holland and directed by co-creator/producer Julia Smith, it was considered a landmark episode in the show's history. 4 possible suspects are seen leaving the Square early in the episode: Tony Carpenter (Oscar James), Ali Osman (Nejdet Salih), Andy O'Brien (Ross Davidson), and Den Watts (Leslie Grantham). As Michelle waits by their rendezvous point, a car pulls up and the fluffy white legs of the soap landlord's poodle Roly leap out of a car and give it all away: Den Watts is the father Michelle's baby. After this storyline the programme started to appear in newspaper cartoons as it moved more and more into the public mainstream. The character of Vicki was written out in 1995, after the actress who played Vicki's mother decided to leave the soap. After an 8-year absence, she was reintroduced by Executive Producer Louise Berridge in 2003 as a rebellious teenager.

Carmel Jackson

Carmel Jackson (also Roberts), played by Judith Jacob, is a health visitor, introduced in a recurring, minor role in 1986. Producers saw potential in the character. Script writers were asked to develop more prominent storylines, and Carmel became a regular character. She is portrayed as a well-meaning, caring individual who is forever getting everyone's problems dumped on her. She is featured in storylines about domestic violence and various family and career upsets. Jacob remained in the role until 1989, when she opted to leave. Off-screen, the character has been the subject of criticism regarding the portrayal of her profession from the Health Visitors Association. In July 1984, before EastEnders went to air, the show's creators, Tony Holland and Julia Smith, attended an opening evening at the Anna Scher Theatre School in North London, to find actors for roles in their upcoming serial. According to Holland and Smith, Anna Scher's school was unlike many other drama schools, where students were "ironed out", all looking and sounding the same. At Anna Scher's school, students' natural personalities and accents were encouraged, "her students aren't taught how to act, they're helped to dig inside themselves and be." In Holland and Smith's own words, this was "just the sort of non-acting that [EastEnders] was looking for".

Harry Reynolds

Harry Reynolds, played by Gareth Potter, is a college friend of Kelvin Carpenter (Paul J. Medford) who first appears along with Tessa Parker (Josephine Melville) in June 1986. Both Harry and Tessa have radical Marxist beliefs and it isn't long before they manage to recruit Kelvin to the same way of thinking.

Tessa Parker

Tessa Parker, played by Josephine Melville, is a college friend of Kelvin Carpenter (Paul J. Medford) and Harry Reynolds (Gareth Potter) who first appears in June 1986. Both Harry and Tessa have radical Marxist beliefs and it isn't long before they manage to recruit Kelvin to the same way of thinking. Tessa soon discovers that she and Kelvin have more in common than their beliefs. She finds him attractive and they start dating.

Pat Butcher

Pat Evans (also Wicks and Butcher) is played by Pam St. Clement from 1986 to 2016. Pat is also played by Emma Cooke in a soap 'bubble' Pat and Mo: Ashes to Ashes, delving into her past with sister-in-law Mo Harris, which first aired in 2004. Pat is the third-longest-running character in the soap, coming after Ian Beale (Adam Woodyatt), who has featured in the soap since it first aired, and Dot Branning (June Brown). The character of Pat was conceived by the creators of EastEnders, Tony Holland and Julia Smith, in 1984. Although not one of the serial's original protagonists, Pat is referred to in the character outline of Pete Beale, who appeared on-screen in EastEnders first episode, as written by Smith and Holland in their book, EastEnders: The Inside Story: "[Pete] married very young to Pat – it turned out to be a total disaster. They were too young, rushing into a difficult life for all the wrong reasons, and truthfully, [Pat] was a vicious shrew...[Pete] divorced [Pat] and married Kathy when he was 24...His two sons by his first marriage are nineteen and twenty and he hardly sees them..." On 7 July 2011, it was announced that St. Clement had quit EastEnders. The actress revealed that she wanted to try other things, saying "I have enjoyed 25 and a half wonderful years in EastEnders creating the character of Pat but feel it's time to hang up her earrings. Leaving the EastEnders 'family' will be akin to a bereavement. But I'm looking forward to the other work and life opportunities that I will have the time to pursue." Pat left later in the year and executive producer Bryan Kirkwood said her departure was a "fitting" storyline. Pat's son David Wicks (Michael French) returned for her departure.

Eddie Hunter

Eddie Hunter, played by Simon Henderson, is a flamboyantly dressed friend of Simon Wicks (Nick Berry) and he is first seen in Albert Square in June 1986. Eddie and Simon were part of a band, and before Simon came to Walford, he had borrowed money from loan sharks and was left owing them huge amounts of money that he couldn't pay back. Eddie was happy to leave Simon with the debt and disappeared to work as a redcoat in Clacton, so the band dissolved. However, when the debts are finally repaid, Simon decides to regroup and he contacts Eddie to rejoin the band. The reformed group, known as "The Banned", consist of Simon, Eddie, Kelvin Carpenter (Paul J. Medford), Sharon Watts (Letitia Dean), Ian Beale (Adam Woodyatt) and Harry Reynolds (Gareth Potter). Eddie is the lead guitarist.

Irene

Irene (credited as Aunty Irene), played by Katherine Parr, is the aunt of Lofty Holloway (Tom Watt) – his mother's sister. Lofty does not have a close relationship with his stern mother, but he dotes on his aunt Irene and she is the only relative he has contact with.
untie Irene first appears in July 1986, when her nephew Lofty and his fiancée Michelle Fowler (Susan Tully) visit her in the nursing home where she lives. She has been told that she only had six months to live, as she has terminal cancer. She tells Michelle that she had been in love with a man in 1938, but he was killed in an accident and she had never married.

She attends Lofty and Michelle's wedding in September 1986, only to see her beloved nephew jilted at the altar. Later in the year Lofty and Michelle sort out their differences and finally get married. Irene worries that Michelle is merely using Lofty, but Michelle promises she will not hurt him. Satisfied, Irene gives their union her blessing and also pays for their honeymoon as a wedding gift.

Irene visits Lofty and Michelle in March 1987, giving Lofty instructions about her funeral. Irene worries that Lofty will not cope once she has gone and tries to make him accept that she will soon be dead. Lofty is distressed at the prospect of losing his aunt and cries into her lap. In June 1987 Lofty visits Irene at the hospital. She is in obvious pain and can no longer see. The following episode Lofty hears that his aunt has finally succumbed to the cancer that had been slowly killing her for years. He attends her funeral on 23 June 1987.

Colin Russell

Colin Russell, played by Michael Cashman, is a middle-class yuppie described as an amiable chap with a kind heart who often ends up being used by the less considerate locals. He is Walford's first on-screen gay resident and when his sexuality is eventually revealed it causes shockwaves around the Square. Colin is EastEnders first homosexual character. Introduced in August 1986, Colin was one of the more popular characters in the early years of the programme. At first the audience and the residents of Walford were kept in the dark about the fact that Colin was gay. This changed by the end of the year, at which time Colin acquired a young boyfriend named Barry Clark (Gary Hailes). Colin was one of the most controversial characters of his time – mainly because gay-orientated content was still relatively rare on prime-time television during the mid-1980s. Gay characters that existed were usually farcical, camp parodies, created purely for comic relief, such as Mr Humphries in the situation comedy, Are You Being Served?.

Tom Clements

Tom Clements, played by Donald Tandy between 1986 and 1988, is an army war veteran. Tom is first seen in Albert Square in August 1986. He lives with his spinster sister in the council house at Number 25 Albert Square and he initially works for the council as custodian of the community centre. Tom accepts an offer to work as potman at The Queen Victoria public house. He is paid in pints and occasional cash-in-hand. He has an allotment and competes with Arthur Fowler (Bill Treacher) in the growing of leeks and marrows. Tom's leeks are damaged by Roly the dog, which Tom initially accuses Arthur of doing. Tom then takes Arthur's leeks and enters them into the Walford & District Allotment Society Show and wins first prize. After his sister dies, Tom seeks the female company of Dot Cotton (June Brown) and Pat Wicks (Pam St. Clement), but Dot remains faithful to her marriage vows and Pat thinks Tom is too old for her boisterous lifestyle. Later, Tom swaps lodgings with Dot and moves next door to the flat at Number 23A Albert Square. After feeling unwell, Tom stumbles into the pub toilets and dies of a heart attack on 21 April 1988. As he has no close relatives or friends surviving, Dot takes it upon herself to arrange his funeral and dispose of his personal belongings. She is named executor of his will, and is further shocked to find that Tom carried a small picture of her in his pocket. Dot asks Ian Beale (Adam Woodyatt) to cater for the wake. She is furious when she is the only one who attends Tom's funeral.

Dr Singh

Dr Jaggat Singh, played by Amerjit Deu, first arrives in Albert Square in November 1986. He is employed by Dr Harold Legg (Leonard Fenton) as a locum to cover the surgery for him several days a week.

Naima Jeffery (Shreela Ghosh) shows a romantic interest in Jaggat and they go on several dates. Naima's cousin Rezaul Kabir (Tanveer Ghani) is furious as Jaggat is a Sikh and Naima is Muslim, and he tries to provoke Jaggat into a fight in The Queen Victoria one night. However, Jaggat just laughs off Rezaul's aggression and they eventually become friends. In the end nothing serious ever develops between Jaggat and Naima anyway, as Naima ends the relationship to marry Farrukh – a suitor from Bangladesh.

Having Lou Beale (Anna Wing), Ethel Skinner (Gretchen Franklin) and Dot Cotton (June Brown) as patients sharpens his interest in the elderly and Jaggat leaves the Square in December 1987 for full-time work with old people in a Northern home. Shortly before leaving, he persuades Ethel to move into sheltered housing at Prosper Estate.

Barry Clark

Barry Clark, played by Gary Hailes, is a cockney barrow-boy, and an unlikely partner for the gay, middle-class yuppie, Colin Russell (Michael Cashman). He is much younger than his middle-aged boyfriend and as such Colin's role is almost paternal. Barry is open about his sexuality to everyone except his volatile father – and when he is finally told he takes the news so badly that Barry turns straight just to appease him – although he is never very successful at it. Barry is one half of Walford's first homosexual couple. His boyfriend, Colin, had already been introduced to the show several months prior to Barry's arrival and he had proven to be an extremely popular addition to the cast. Both the audience and the residents of Walford had been kept in the dark about the fact that Colin was gay. This changed upon Barry's first scene on-screen, whereby the audience learnt that he had spent the night with Colin after picking him up the night before (off-screen) at a gay club. Colin and Barry were two of the most controversial characters of their time – mainly because gay-orientated content was still relatively rare on prime time television during the mid-1980s. Gay characters that existed were usually farcical camp parodies, created purely for comic relief, such as Mr. Humphries in the situation comedy, Are You Being Served?.

Rezaul Kabir

Rezaul Kabir, played by Tanveer Ghani, arrives in Albert Square in December 1986. He is Naima Jeffery's (Shreela Ghosh) cousin and had been sent by Naima's family to help her run her grocery store, First Til Last. Naima is extremely angry about Rezaul's arrival, but her family are adamant that he has to stay, so she begrudgingly puts up with his presence. Rezaul is rather bossy, pretentious, chauvinistic and arrogant, and instantly tries to take over the running of the shop. On his first night, Rezaul puts forth a scheme to increase the shop's profits and asks for a month's trial. Naima agrees to the trial. Rezaul then proceeds to mark up the shop's items to unreasonably high prices as well as steal money from the till. Naima is furious and to make matters worse it soon becomes clear that Rezaul has amorous intentions towards her.

Naima isn't remotely interested in Rezaul so she sets about finding herself a new boyfriend to put him off. She starts dating the Square's new doctor, Jaggat Singh (Amerjit Deu). Rezaul, a Muslim, becomes very envious when he sees them together and tells Naima that she is making a fool of herself, smiling and fawning over a Sikh. This culminates in Rezaul trying to pick a fight with Dr. Singh in The Queen Victoria one night, almost getting himself barred in the process.

In April 1987, Naima and Rezaul get into a shouting match when he tells her that her family have decided she has to marry him. He is furious when she flatly refuses, but later admits that he is actually relieved and tells her he doesn't want to marry her either. Naima's defiance displeases her family and they subsequently break off all ties with her. Rezaul, it seems, is rather impressed with Naima and tells her that she is no ordinary Bengali girl as he'd first thought.

Things between Naima and Rezaul improve after this, and when Naima's family eventually send over another of her cousins for her to marry, he goes out of his way to help their blossoming romance. After Naima leaves England to live in Bangladesh, Rezaul runs The First Til Last in her place for a while. Whilst managing the shop, he catches Charlie Cotton (Christopher Hancock) shoplifting and makes a citizen's arrest. Charlie then has to appear at the Magistrates' Court and is given a £50 fine. When Naima's family sell the shop to Ashraf Karim (Aftab Sachak) at the end of the year, Rezaul leaves Walford to resume his studies. His last appearance is in January 1988.

Others

References

1986
, EastEnders
EastEnders